Elections to Bournemouth Borough Council on the south coast of England were held on 1 May 2003. The whole council (a unitary authority) was up for election. The number of seats at this election was reduced from 57 to 54 (wards reduced from 19 to 18).

Election result

|}

2003 English local elections
2003
2000s in Dorset